The Painter of Acropolis 606 (sometimes Painter of Athens 606) was a black-figure vase painter, active around 570–560 BC.

His name vase is a dinos discovered on the Athenian Acropolis and now on display in the National Museum at Athens (inventory acr. 606). The vase is representative of the "new seriousness" which was then emerging in Attic painting. On its main frieze, it depicts a battle between warriors and chariots. R.M. Cook says:

The subsidiary friezes are of animals, plants and horsemen. On the lower part, there is an eddy of animal figures, resembling the work of Kleitias. His sensitivity for colour and details also resembles that artist. He took a careful interest in the posture of his figures, and expended much effort on such details as armour or helmets. He painted many so-called "Rider amphorae", with a more pronounced belly than normal amphorae and a decorative scheme comparable to that of Horsehead Amphorae.

Bibliography

 Beazley, John: Attic Black-figure Vase-painters. Oxford 1956, p. 81.
 Boardman, John: Schwarzfigurige Vasen aus Athen. Ein Handbuch, von Zabern, 4. edn, Mainz 1994 (Kulturgeschichte der Antiken Welt, Vol 1) , p. 39

Ancient Greek vase painters
6th-century BC Greek people
Anonymous artists of antiquity
Artists of ancient Attica